Baktygul Toktobolotova (born 5 July 2000) is a Kyrgyzstani football forward, who plays in the Turkish Women's Super League for Dudullu Spor, the Kyrgyzstan women's national football team, and the Kyrgyzstan national futsal team.

Club career 
Toktobolotova played in Uzbekistan for WFC Bunyodkor Tashkent in the 2021–22 season.

By October 2022, she moved to Turkey, and signed with the Istanbul-based club Dudullu Spor to play in the 2022–23 Super League. In the second half of the season, she transferred to Ataşehir Belediyespor.

International career

Football 
In 2016, she took part at the 2017 AFC U-19 Women's Championship qualification.

She was part of the Kyrgyzstan national football team, at the CAFA Women's Championship in 2018 and 2022.

Futsal 
She is a member of the Kyrgyzstan women's national futsal team. In 2020, she played at the CAFA U-19 Women's Futsal Championship.

References 

2000 births
Living people
Kyrgyzstani women's footballers
Women's association football forwards
Kyrgyzstani women's futsal players
Kyrgyzstan women's international footballers
Kyrgyzstani expatriate footballers
Kyrgyzstani expatriate sportspeople in Uzbekistan
Expatriate women's footballers in Uzbekistan
Kyrgyzstani expatriate sportspeople in Turkey
Expatriate women's footballers in Turkey
Turkish Women's Football Super League players
Dudullu Spor players
Ataşehir Belediyespor players